is a manga series written by Hiromu Shinozuka and serialized in Ciao magazine from July 2001 through December 2005. It was also published in twelve collected volumes by Shogakukan. The manga series was awarded in the 2003 Kodansha Manga Award and in the 2004 Shogakukan Manga Award for children's manga. The series was licensed for an English language release in North America by Viz Media. Four months later, the show aired in Japan for the first time. Chuang Yi released the manga in English in Singapore.

An anime series named  by Studio Hibari was adapted from the manga. It premiered in Japan on TV Tokyo on April 6, 2002, and ran for 172 episodes until September 27, 2005. The anime series is also licensed by Viz Media for an English language release in North America, and by ShoPro Entertainment, as Mirmo!.

Plot
 Season 1
The fairy protagonist is a love fairy named Mirmo (Mirumo in the Japanese version). Katie Minami (Kaede Minami in the Japanese version) is the human protagonist and a cheerful and energetic eighth-grader who is shy around her male classmates, which makes it difficult for her to date. One day, on her way home from school, she walks into a mysterious shop and buys a blue cocoa mug. When she arrives at home, she peeks into the bottom of the mug and discovers an engraved note which says, "If you read this message aloud while pouring hot cocoa into the mug, a love fairy ("muglox") will appear and grant your every wish." The skeptical but curious Kaede follows the directions and announces her wish to date Dylan Yuki (Setsu Yuuki in the Japanese version), her crush. Mirmo arrives. At first, she is afraid of him but later understands that he is a muglox. Kaede soon finds out that Mirmo prefers eating chocolate and creating mischief over helping Katie.

Mirumo is a prince of the muglox world. Horrified at the prospect of having to marry Rima (Rirumu in the Japanese version), his princess bride-to-be, Mirmo escaped the muglox world. Hot on his heels, however, are Rima, Yatch (Yashichi in the Japanese version) the bounty hunter, Mulu (Murumo; Mirmo's brother), and many other muglox as well. The villains of the first season are the Warumo gang, a gang of criminals who plan to overthrow the Marumo kingdom. Though they are villains, they actually aren't evil; they just pull childish pranks and faint after hearing an evil plan. At the end of the season, Akumi gives Warumo Gang a time sphere, which they play around with and accidentally smash, causing the muglox world to freeze. Mirmo, Mulu, Rima, Yatch and their partners save the muglox world by having the fairies dance in front of a magical door (which allows it to open) and having the partners find the magic time bird which flew into the door to escape being captured by them.

 Season 2
In this season, a new transfer student named Saori comes to Katie's school. The villain Darkman, created by the darkness in human hearts, tries to resurrect himself. He influences the minds of Akumi and the Warumo gang. Session magic is introduced for two-person magic, with each person combo producing different magic. Darkman controls Saori and uses her flute to control peoples' emotions. He is then defeated by Golden Mirmo, the outcome of three person session magic. With the help of Nezumi/Rato, he is resurrected until the muglox's four-person session magic gives Saori the power to defeat Darkman. The two worlds are separated until reunited by the muglox and their partners' friendship. Saori goes to Germany to study music with Akumi as her new partner.

 Season 3
In this season, a robot octopus, Tako, convinces the gang to look for the legendary seven crystals which are drawn out by different emotions. After all are collected, the gang faces seven trials. Mirmo must pass these tests for the crystals to unite and form a pendant. Tako steals it to save his girlfriend and his land. In the end, they succeed and Tako becomes king of crystal land.

 Season 4
Two new characters, Koichi and Haruka, are introduced. Koichi has a crush on Katie, and Haruka is Setsu's childhood friend who wants to be a cartoonist. Her partner Panta is a ghost muglox. Thanks to Azumi, Katie and Koichi kiss. Also, Koichi confessed to Katie after Katie had a whole day of helping him confess to his crush that she didn't know was her. Setsu starts to fall in love with Katie, and Koichi realizes that he is not right for Kaede and gives up on her. After Haruka tells Dylan she loves him, he chooses her over Katie. Haruka realizes Dylan's true love is Katie and gives up on him. Dylan tells Katie he loves her and they become a couple; Katie's wish is fulfilled. Mirmo has to leave in one hour or something terrible will happen, which the Warumo gang make so. Mirmo loses all memories of Katie and turns into a rabbit. Katie brings his memories back and he turns back to normal.

Characters

The main characters of Mirmo! are mugloxes, or love fairies, and four human teenagers. The muglox Mirmo has been assigned the task of granting Kaede Minami's wishes, though he spends most of his time eating chocolate and running away from Rima, a female muglox assigned to Setsu Yuki, the boy Kaede is infatuated with. Yasichi, Mirmo's muglox archrival, is assigned to Azumi Hidaka, a girl who also loves Setsu and is jealous of Kaede. Mirmo's brother, Murumo, is assigned to Kaoru Matsutake, a boy who falls in love with Kaede. The muglox fairies use musical instruments as their magical tools. Later on in the show two new characters, Koichi Sumita and Haruka Morishita, enter the race of love for Setsu and Kaede's hearts. They get their very own muglox partners as well – Popii and Panta.

Media

Manga

Mirmo! was published by Shogakukan in Ciao magazine from 2001 to 2006 and collected in 12 tankōbon volumes.

Anime
The series was adapted as a 172-episode anime series broadcast in Japan on TXN from April 2002 through September 2005.

Season 1
Episode 1 - Fairy Mirumo has arrived!
Episode 2 - Love from Rirumu!?
Episode 3 - Meet Ninja Yashichi! 
Episode 4 - Kaede's Magical Diet
Episode 5 - Mini Mini Kaede's Large Adventure
Episode 6 - Was love taken away?
Episode 7 - Let's Repair Love
Episode 8 - Mirumo vs Murumo 
Episode 9 - Super Obochama, Matsutake-kun 
Episode 10 - Love's Four-cornered Battle
Episode 11 - Father comes, and returns immediately!
Episode 12 - Rirumu and Mogu-chan and...
Episode 13 - A Very Tiring Day
Episode 14 - Mirumo's Failure!?
Episode 15 - This is bad! The Warumo Group 
Episode 16 - Kaede, off to Mirumo's hometown...
Episode 17 - Gift from the Gaia Tribe
Episode 18 - Summer! The Sea! I am Matsutake!
Episode 19 - Fireworks and Magic and Grandpa
Episode 20 - Mirumo, can you fit in!? 
Episode 21 - Caught in the Haunted Mansion!? 
Episode 22 - Yashichi's First Love 
Episode 23 - Rirumu's Fairy Fortune-Telling
Episode 24 - Murumo's Decayed Tooth 
Episode 25 - This is even serious! The Warumo Gang
Episode 26 - Rescue Mirumo's Hometown!
Episode 27 - Let's go to the Fairy School 
Episode 28 - Do your best for the Double Athletic Meet
Episode 29 - Rirumu's Important Day 
Episode 30 - What, Mirumo is part of the Warumo Gang!?
Episode 31 - It's Kinta!
Episode 32 - Murumo's Rival, Papi
Episode 33 - Goodbye, Azumi
Episode 34 - Mumotaro's Demon Extermination
Episode 35 - Movie Star? Yuuki-kun
Episode 36 - Mirumo has been captured!
Episode 37 - Mirumo vs Mekamirumo
Episode 38 - Leave it to Oiratachi!
Episode 39 - Nandakawakannaino?
Episode 40 - Chocolate Event of the Snow Mountains
Episode 41 - The Fairy Sugoroku Meet
Episode 42 - Mikan and Kotashi
Episode 43 - Kinta, again!
Episode 44 - All the best! Fairies
Episode 45 - Love through Oto's Chocolate? -
Episode 46 - News, 3 Daughters
Episode 47 - Is it so?
Episode 48 - The Fairy's Doodle Note
Episode 49 - Touching Matsutake's Fight!
Episode 50 - Defeat Mirumo of the Past!
Episode 51 - The Fairy World which has Stopped in Time
Episode 52 - Move! Mirumo's Hometown
Episode 53 - Marakasu has been Destroyed!?
Episode 54 - Mysterious Transfer Student, Shiori
Episode 55 - Hidaka-san's Brother?
Episode 56 - Cake Talk
Episode 57 - A Flower by the name of Rirumu
Episode 58 - Mirumo and Murumo's Ship
Episode 59 - The Warumo Group has finally disbanded!?
Episode 60 - Murumo's Things
Episode 61 - Dangerous Risaitaru
Episode 62 - Kinta and Ponta
Episode 63 - Lady, I am Kabi!
Episode 64 - In any case, it's Powerful Magic (Part 1)
Episode 65 - In any case, it's Powerful Magic (Part 2)
Episode 66 - Either one or Both?
Episode 67 - Whose Fault
Episode 68 - Super Sister, Momo-chan
Episode 69 - Important Friends
Episode 70 - Confined with the Animals
Episode 71 - Sorry
Episode 72 - Please meet Yamane
Episode 73 - Shall we Retreat?
Episode 74 - The Bouchama Quest, Mystery of the Perapera Sword
Episode 75 - Protect the Secret Base!
Episode 76 - Let's go to the TV Station!
Episode 77 - The Revival of Daaku
Episode 78 - Golden Mirumo!?

Season 2
Episode 79 - Hello, I am Mirumo!
Episode 80 - Shiiru is Haruna
Episode 81 - The Way to Become Friends with Fairies
Episode 82 - Fairy Concert
Episode 83 - Charge! The Race of Wilderness
Episode 84 - Wild Shakebi
Episode 85 - The Honest Fairy, Mirumo?
Episode 86 - Tragedy of Kokanemochi Clan
Episode 87 - Attttack, Rrrrecive
Episode 88 - Fairy Stick Clock~Chapter 1~
Episode 89 - Fairy Stick Clock~Final Chapter~
Episode 90 - Story of Princess Kaederara
Episode 91 - Raise up! Warumo Kids
Episode 92 - Rirumu and Akumi's 30 Minutes Cooking
Episode 93 - Fairy In Love
Episode 94 - Super Dangerous! Mimomo Shop
Episode 95 - Fairy M's Lightning Proposal!?
Episode 96 - Must See! Fairies go on an Onsen Trip
Episode 97 - Doki! Date with Shiori
Episode 98 - Friendship that became Parapara
Episode 99 - Stinky Music Fair
Episode 100 - My Name is Daaku
Episode 101 - Melody that Saves the World
Episode 102 - Goodbye Mirumo...Ahh!

Season 3
Episode 103 - It begins from Tako
Episode 104 - It's really Carl
Episode 105 - I Like P Man
Episode 106 - Our Treasure
Episode 107 - The Rock Cannot be Broken
Episode 108 - Fairy Ninja! Garagara Battle
Episode 109 - It's really Doji! The Warumo Group
Episode 110 - That kind of Love, this kind of Love
Episode 111 - Tako's Crystal Battle
Episode 112 - The Fairy Pick!
Episode 113 - Run, jump and then, swim
Episode 114 - Goal of Tears
Episode 115 - How is the Squid?
Episode 116 - Fourteen-Love
Episode 117 - Quiz: Search for the Warumo Kids!
Episode 118 - Baramo has arrived!?
Episode 119 - Akumi and Shiori
Episode 120 - Legend of Rorerai
Episode 121 - Do not say Clumsiness!!
Episode 122 - Watermelon and Pool
Episode 123 - Cake Crumbles
Episode 124 - Goodbye, Kikuki-kun
Episode 125 - Strongest Duel! Aishi vs Koishi
Episode 126 - Okay! Yoimo Gang
Episode 127 - Rabbits are Scary
Episode 128 - Tako's Hometown
Episode 129 - Kaede, Motetemoote
Episode 130 - It's alright for Incho to become the Committee Head?
Episode 131 - Want to become a Woman
Episode 132 - It's Afro, it's Satoru, it's P Man!
Episode 133 - Why, the Warumo Group is really Strong!?
Episode 134 - Warrior of the Darumi Tribe. Kinta!?
Episode 135 - Kaitoh Papan
Episode 136 - King Mirmo
Episode 137 - It's really the King Mirmo!?
Episode 138 - Journey to the West
Episode 139 - Tako's Secret
Episode 140 - Meet TV Ninja!
Episode 141 - Murumo and the Flying Baby
Episode 142 - I am, Shinigami!
Episode 143 - F. D. C VS K. T. C
Episode 144 - The Warumo Group has Fallen in Love
Episode 145 - The Last Crystal
Episode 146 - Shock! The Seven Trials
Episode 147 - Tako's Kako
Episode 148 - Crystal Land
Episode 149 - Hole of Azase!
Episode 150 - Forever, Kumocho

Season 4
Episode 151 - Separating, Meeting, A New School Term
Episode 152 - Quarreling Shop of Love
Episode 153 - Teach me the Forces of Love
Episode 154 - I am Panta!
Episode 155 - Stomach black strike
Episode 156 - Love of Lavender
Episode 157 - Love of Lavender (Muglox Edition)
Episode 158 - Kikuki-kun's First Love!?
Episode 159 - Tako and Panta's arrival!
Episode 160 - Counterattack of the pine bamboo
Episode 161 - Large Confound Conflict! Chick Wars
Episode 162 - It is the U-Ray! The Warumo Group!
Episode 163 - Method of drawing a comedy manga!
Episode 164 - It's summer celebration! The large decisive battle!
Episode 165 - Sumita VS Kikuki-kun! Battle of love!
Episode 166 - The storm of love raging...
Episode 167 - The increase of shaking love!
Episode 168 - Work harder, Kaede Minami!
Episode 169 - Rescue Panta!
Episode 170 - Decision of each one!
Episode 171 - Kaede's wish, Mirumo's leave!
Episode 172 - Let's all Mirumo De Pon!!! (Finale)

Music
Thirteen CD soundtracks and character song compilations have been released for the Mirmo series. One was released by Toshiba-EMI, four by Tri-M, and the rest by Konami. In addition, Konami released two drama CDs for Mirumo.

Video games
Seven Mirumo video games have been created and released by Konami on a variety of platforms.

"Wagamama Fairy Mirumo de Pon! – The Legend of Golden Maracas"(Launched May 2002, Game Boy Advance Use)
"Wagamama Fairy Mirumo de Pon! – The Mirumo goes Magic School"(Launched March 2003, PlayStation Use)
"Wagamama Fairy Mirumo de Pon! – The Knight Soldiers"(Launched September 2003, Game Boy Advance Use)
"Wagamama Fairy Mirumo de Pon! – The 8Man's Fairy"(Launched December 2003, Game Boy Advance Use)
"Wagamama Fairy Mirumo de Pon! – The Dream of Cake"(Launched July 2004, Game Boy Advance Use)
"Wagamama Fairy Mirumo de Pon! – The Kagi and Tobira"(Launched December 2004, Game Boy Advance Use)
"Wagamama Fairy Mirumo de Pon! – The Dokidoki Memoreal Panic"(Launched September 2005, Game Boy Advance Use)

Reception
 

The manga received the 2003 Kodansha Manga Award and the 2004 Shogakukan Manga Award for children's manga. The anime also received TV Tokyo's award for top-rated new program in 2003.

References

External links
 Official TV Tokyo Mirumo de Pon website 
 Official Shogakukan Production Mirmo! anime website 
 Mirmo! Official Viz Media Mirmo! anime website
 Official Konami Mirmo! video game website 
 

2001 manga
2002 anime television series debuts
Shogakukan manga
Shōjo manga
Studio Hibari
TV Tokyo original programming
Viz Media anime
Winner of Kodansha Manga Award (Children)
Winners of the Shogakukan Manga Award for children's manga